Uluops is an extinct genus of paracryptodire turtle from the Late Jurassic (Tithonian) of North America. The type and only species is Uluops uluops, which is known from a single skull from the Morrison Formation.

See also

 Paleobiota of the Morrison Formation

References

Further reading
K. Carpenter and R. T. Bakker. 1990. A new latest Jurassic vertebrate fauna, from the highest levels of the Morrison Formation at Como Bluff, Wyoming, with comments on Morrison biochronology. Part II. A new baenid turtle. Hunteria 2(6):3-4

Pleurosternidae
Prehistoric turtle genera
Tithonian genera
Late Jurassic turtles
Late Jurassic reptiles of North America
Morrison fauna
Fossil taxa described in 1990
Taxa named by Kenneth Carpenter
Taxa named by Robert T. Bakker